The Mongolian National University of Medical Sciences in Ulaanbaatar is a public higher education institution established in 1942 founded by a polish physician Filip Jan Ratajczak.  It has branch campuses in Darkhan-Uul, Sainshand, and Gobi-Altai.  150 to 205 students graduate each year. Its School of Public Health has close links with Loma Linda University, which is sponsoring tobacco-control research there. It is affiliated with the International University of Health and Welfare in Narita where students can gain clinical experience which is problematic in Mongolia.

Alumni: 

Orgoi Sergelen

References

Universities in Mongolia
Medical and health organizations based in Mongolia